Mike Rossman (born Michael Albert DePiano on July 1, 1955) is an American former professional boxer who was the WBA light heavyweight champion of the world. He is of both Italian and Jewish descent, which led to his monikers "The Kosher Butcher" and "The Jewish Bomber".

Life and career
Rossman was born in Turnersville, New Jersey, as Michael Albert DePiano. Rossman is his mother's maiden name, which he uses rather than that of his father. Rossman's father was Italian, and his mother Jewish. He is Jewish, and boxed with a Star of David on his shorts. He began boxing at 14 and turned pro on August 10, 1973.

Rossman fought Víctor Galíndez for the light heavyweight championship of the world on the undercard of an Ali–Spinks rematch in September 1978. Many thought Galindez would defeat him, but Rossman opened up cuts over Galindez's eyes and continued fighting until near the end of the 13th round, when the referee stopped the fight, and Rossman became world champion. Rossman made one successful defense before his hometown Philadelphia fans in December of the same year, stopping Italian challenger Aldo Traversaro in the fifth round after opening a wound on Aldo's forehead with a left hook.

Later, after losing the title back to Galindez in 1979 (see below), his career declined as he lost several matches; he never again fought a title match. He fought into the early 1980s, and perhaps the biggest name he faced in post-championship status was the upstart Dwight Braxton (today known as Dwight Muhammad Qawi), who defeated him in seven rounds in May 1981.

Rossman vs. Galindez championship rematch
In February 1979, Rossman participated in what is sometimes considered one of professional boxing's most embarrassing moments (at least in modern times). At a scheduled rematch between Rossman and Galindez, Rossman was left waiting in the ring as Galindez failed to appear: A dispute about the judges of the match between the WBA and the Nevada Athletic Commission prevented the fight from being for the title, so Galindez camp refused to fight. After immediate attempts to remedy the situation failed, the fight was suspended, and rescheduled two months later in April 1979.

With Rossman perhaps still fretting about boxing politics, Galindez was focused on regaining the title, and was able to defeat Rossman. Rossman apparently broke his right hand during the bout, severely limiting his boxing ability. The pain became worse over the course of the fight, and unbearable to a point where Rossman told his father-manager after the ninth round that he could not continue. Galindez was thus able to reclaim the championship.

Professional boxing record

Miscellaneous
Rossman has a tattoo of the Star of David on the calf of his right leg.
Rossman now lives in Atlantic City, New Jersey.
Rossman was inducted into the New Jersey Boxing Hall of Fame.

See also
List of world light-heavyweight boxing champions
List of Jewish boxers

References

External links

Mike Rossman - CBZ Profile
NJ Boxing Hall of Fame bio and record

 

1955 births
Living people
American male boxers
American people of Italian descent
Jewish American boxers
People from Washington Township, Gloucester County, New Jersey
Boxers from Philadelphia
Jewish boxers
21st-century American Jews
World light-heavyweight boxing champions
World Boxing Association champions